AM Racing is an American professional stock car racing team that competes in the NASCAR Xfinity Series fielding the No. 25 Ford Mustang full-time for Brett Moffitt. They also compete in the NASCAR Craftsman Truck Series fielding the No. 22 Ford F-150 full-time for multiple drivers and in the ARCA Menards Series fielding the No. 32 Ford Mustang for Christian Rose. The team also has a technical alliance with Stewart-Haas Racing.

AM Racing merged into Niece Motorsports for the 2018 season, but split back up from them in 2019 and fielded its own entries again. In 2020, the team moved to the former Front Row Motorsports race shop in Statesville, North Carolina, which they shared with Jordan Anderson Racing and Win-Tron Racing, although the three teams did not merge and remained separate organizations. However, on January 14, 2021, it was announced that AM and Win-Tron would be merging for 2021.

Xfinity Series

Car No. 25 history
Brett Moffitt (2023-Present)
On October 7, 2022, the team announced that they would field an entry into the NASCAR Xfinity Series in 2023. It was announced on December 12, 2022 that Brett Moffitt would drive for the team full-time in the No. 25 Ford Mustang in 2023.

Craftsman Truck Series

Truck No. 22 history

In December 2015, it was announced that AM Racing would enter one truck in the Camping World Truck Series field, the No. 22 Toyota Tundra full-time for Austin Wayne Self. The team's first race was the season opener at Daytona, where Self qualified the truck 19th and finished in that same position, one lap down. In the second race at Atlanta, Self qualified twentieth and finished sixteenth. Self failed to qualify for the third race at Martinsville, but raced with the No. 44 after Tommy Joe Martins crashed his only truck in qualifying and had no backup. Self had variable runs throughout the first half of the season until he broke through for his first top ten, a ninth at the Aspen Dental Eldora Dirt Derby.

The team's operations were taken over by Win-Tron Racing after twelve races. The Self family retained an ownership stake in the team.

After the merger with Win-Tron, performance remained nearly the same, with Austin Wayne Self turning in runs from the teens to twenties. At Martinsville, the team replaced Self with Justin Fontaine, who would be making his Truck debut.  Fontaine qualified on owner points in 29th and moved up three places during the race to finish 26th. Self then took over the truck for the Striping Technology 350, finishing 22nd. For the Phoenix race, Self was again swapped out, this time for the son of NASCAR on NBC broadcaster Marty Snider, Myatt Snider. Snider qualified 19th and finished 17th. Self closed out the season at Homestead-Miami Speedway, finishing 25th. The No. 22 truck finished 22nd in owner points in its debut season.

For the 2017 season, AM Racing announced a partnership with Joe Gibbs Racing for engine power. On February 10, 2017, it was announced that J. J. Yeley would drive the No. 22 Legrand Tundra at the season opener at Daytona, while Self would drive the No. 32 truck. The team would run five races in total during the year under the AM Racing banner, the other four with Self behind the wheel. AM partnered with Niece Motorsports and Martins Motorsports to run Self in most of the remaining races.

In October 2017, it was announced that Self would move to Niece Motorsports for the 2018 season. 

AM Racing reopened in 2019, with Self in the No. 22 for another full season. Self got the team their first top 5 at Michigan Speedway. However, Self was suspended in April of that year due to violating NASCAR's substance abuse policy, and Bubba Wallace filled in for 2 races (at Martinsville and Texas in March) before Self was reinstated.

Self returned full-time in 2020. He got two top 10 finishes that year, at Texas Motor Speedway and Martinsville Speedway, and finished 16th in points.

Truck No. 32 history
Austin Wayne Self piloted a second entry for the team, the No. 32, at the 2017 season-opener at Daytona. He finished a career-best second after avoiding the big one on the last lap.

Truck No. 37 history
In 2021, Brett Moffitt drove the No. 37 truck at the Corn Belt 150. 

In 2022, the No. 37 returned as AM Racing's second entry and Logan Bearden would drive the truck at COTA as well as Max Gutiérrez driving at Charlotte.

Truck No. 66 history
Using Bolen Motorsports' owner points, Justin Fontaine drove the No. 66 truck in one race in 2017.

ARCA Menards Series

Car No. 32 history

Following Win-Tron Racing's merger into AM Racing for the 2021 season. Howie DiSavino III, who drove the car part-time in 2019 and 2020, continued to do so in 2021. He made his first start at Daytona that year.

In 2022, The team fielded the No. 32 car part-time for Max Gutiérrez at Daytona and Talladega. Austin Wayne Self drove the No. 32 car once at Watkins-Glen. In October the team announced their intentions to return full-time in 2023.

On January 10, 2023, the team announced that Christian Rose would drive full-time in the main ARCA Series in their No. 32 car.

ARCA Menards Series West

Car No. 32 history
In 2023, the team fielded the No. 32 car part-time for Christian Rose.

References

External links
 

NASCAR teams
2016 establishments in North Carolina
Auto racing teams established in 2016
Companies based in North Carolina
American auto racing teams